Jonathan Josué Águila Joya (born 11 November 1990 in San Miguel, El Salvador) is a Salvadoran professional footballer.

Club career
Born in San Miguel, Águila started in the FundaMadrid project and then joined Águila San Isidro and later, ADI.

His professional career started in February 2008, when he signed a contract with Salvadoran national league club, Águila.

He made his professional debut on 5 April 2008, in a league match against San Salvador. He scored his first goal on 31 January 2009 in a league match against Luis Ángel Firpo.

Career statistics

Club

References

1990 births
Living people
People from San Miguel, El Salvador
Association football midfielders
Salvadoran footballers
El Salvador international footballers
C.D. Águila footballers
2014 Copa Centroamericana players
C.D. Chalatenango footballers